Vanur taluk is a taluk of Viluppuram district of the Indian state of Tamil Nadu. The headquarters of the taluk is the town of Vanur.

Demographics
According to the 2011 census, the taluk of Vanur had a population of 196,282 with 98,852 males and 97,430 females. There were 986 women for every 1,000 men. The taluk had a literacy rate of 68.73%. Child population in the age group below 6 was 11,028 males and 10,647 females.

See also
Pombur

References 

Taluks of Villupuram district